WDPM-DT (channel 18) is a religious television station licensed to Mobile, Alabama, United States, serving southwest Alabama and northwest Florida as an owned-and-operated station of the Daystar Television Network. The station's transmitter is located near Robertsdale, Alabama.

History

The station signed on after the analog signal of PBS member station WSRE (channel 23) signed off for the last time on February 17, 2009.

Since the "channel 23.1" series of virtual channel designations already identifies the existing PBS station's digital subchannels, this numbering sequence would not be available to the new station. According to the ATSC standard, WDPM-DT's channel numbers would therefore need to be displayed (using PSIP) using numbering based on WSRE's digital channel number, 31. From sign-on until February 2010, the station displayed as Channel 4.1, which is considered a violation of these standards.

Subchannels
The station's digital signal is multiplexed:

References

External links

Television channels and stations established in 2009
DPM-DT
2009 establishments in Alabama
Daystar (TV network) affiliates